Laurence Baker may refer to:

 Laurence S. Baker (1830–1907), officer in the Confederate States Army
 Laurie Baker (Laurence Wilfred Baker, 1917–2007), Indian architect

See also
Lawrence Baker (disambiguation)
Larry Baker (disambiguation)
Laurie Baker (disambiguation)